Erwiniana is a genus of beetles in the family Carabidae, containing the following species:

 Erwiniana aetholia (Erwin, 1973)
 Erwiniana alticola (Erwin, 1994)
 Erwiniana am (Erwin, 1994)
 Erwiniana ampliata (Bates, 1884)
 Erwiniana anchicaya (Erwin, 1994)
 Erwiniana angustia (Erwin, 1994)
 Erwiniana anterocostis (Erwin, 1973)
 Erwiniana apicisulcata (Erwin, 1973)
 Erwiniana baeza (Erwin, 1994)
 Erwiniana batesi (Erwin, 1973)
 Erwiniana belti (Bates, 1878)
 Erwiniana bisulcifrons (Erwin, 1973)
 Erwiniana chiriboga (Erwin, 1994)
 Erwiniana crassa (Erwin, 1994)
 Erwiniana dannyi (Erwin, 1994)
 Erwiniana depressisculptilis (Erwin, 1994)
 Erwiniana equanegrei (Erwin, 1994)
 Erwiniana esheje (Erwin, 1994)
 Erwiniana eugeneae (Erwin, 1994)
 Erwiniana exigupunctata (Erwin, 1994)
 Erwiniana foveosculptilis (Erwin, 1994)
 Erwiniana grossipunctata (Erwin, 1973)
 Erwiniana grutii (Bates, 1871)
 Erwiniana hamatilis (Erwin, 1994)
 Erwiniana henryi (Erwin, 1994)
 Erwiniana hilaris (Bates, 1871)
 Erwiniana huacamayas (Erwin, 1994)
 Erwiniana indetecticostis (Erwin, 1994)
 Erwiniana iris (Erwin, 1973)
 Erwiniana irisculptilis (Erwin, 1994)
 Erwiniana jacupiranga (Erwin, 1994)
 Erwiniana jefe (Erwin, 1994)
 Erwiniana manusculptilis (Erwin, 1994)
 Erwiniana misahualli (Erwin, 1994)
 Erwiniana negrei (Erwin, 1973)
 Erwiniana nigripalpis (Erwin, 1973)
 Erwiniana notesheje (Erwin, 1994)
 Erwiniana notparkeri (Erwin, 1994)
 Erwiniana nox (Erwin, 1994)
 Erwiniana ovatula (Bates, 1871)
 Erwiniana para (Erwin, 1994)
 Erwiniana parainsularis (Erwin, 1973)
 Erwiniana parapara (Erwin, 1994)
 Erwiniana parkeri (Erwin, 1994)
 Erwiniana pfunorum (Erwin, 1994)
 Erwiniana protosculptilis (Erwin, 1994)
 Erwiniana punctisculptilis (Erwin, 1994)
 Erwiniana quadrata (Erwin, 1994)
 Erwiniana rosebudae (Erwin, 1994)
 Erwiniana samiria (Erwin, 1994)
 Erwiniana sculpticollis (Bates, 1871)
 Erwiniana seriata (Erwin, 1973)
 Erwiniana strigosa (Bates, 1871)
 Erwiniana sublaevis (Bates, 1882)
 Erwiniana sulcicostis (Bates, 1882)
 Erwiniana villiersi (Perrault, 1984)
 Erwiniana wygo (Erwin, 1994)

References

Trechinae